Dame Traoré (born 19 May 1986) is a professional footballer who plays in Qatar for Al-Rayyan, as a defender.

Born in France, he represents Qatar at international level.

Career
Born in Metz, Traoré has played club football in France and Qatar for Valenciennes, Sedan and Lekhwiya. The merger of Lekhwiya and the El Jaish under the name of Al-Duhail He joined Qatari club Al-Rayyan in 2018.

International career
Traoré is born in France to parents of Senegalese origin. Early in his career, Traoré moved to Qatar and became a naturalized citizen. Traoré was called up the Qatar B team on 13 November 2013. He made official debut for the team on 25 December in the 2014 WAFF Championship in a 1–0 win against Palestine. He made his international debut for the senior national team in 2013.

Personal life
He is of Senegalese origin. His brothers Mody and Mamadou are also footballers.

References

1986 births
Living people
Qatari footballers
Qatar international footballers
French footballers
Footballers from Metz
Valenciennes FC players
CS Sedan Ardennes players
Lekhwiya SC players
Al-Arabi SC (Qatar) players
El Jaish SC players
Al-Duhail SC players
Al-Rayyan SC players
Ligue 1 players
Qatar Stars League players
Association football defenders
Qatari people of Senegalese descent
Naturalised citizens of Qatar
French sportspeople of Senegalese descent